This is a list of composers who have written music about the Holocaust, or who were directly influenced by the holocaust. This list is alphabetical by name.

A

Chava Alberstein
David Amram (1930– )

B
Dawid Beigelman (1887–1945)
Karel Berman
David Botwinik (1920-2022)

C
John Cage (1912–1992)

E
Hanns Eisler (1898–1962)

F
Grigory Frid (1915–2012)
Erich Frost

G
Mordechai Gebirtig (1877–1942)
Sylvia Glickman (1932–2006)
Hirsh Glick
Osvaldo Golijov (1960– )
Henryk Górecki (1933–2010 )
Olivier Greif (1950–2000)

H
Pavel Haas (1899–1944)
Michael Horvit
William B. Hoskins (1917–1997)

J
Wilfred Josephs

K
Shmerke Kaczerginski
Peysakh Kaplan
Ståle Kleiberg (1958– )
Gideon Klein (1919–1945)
Wally Kleucker (1947– )
Douglas Knehans (1957– )
Józef Koffler
Max Kowalski (1882–1956)

Hans Krása (1899–1944)
Jozef Kropinski
Meyer Kupferman (1926–2003)

L
Szymon Laks
Aron Liebeskind
György Ligeti (1923–2006)
Ruth Lomon

M
Mesías Maiguashca (born 1938) See  (1997)
Olivier Messiaen (1908–1992)
Darius Milhaud (1892–1974)
Oskar Morawetz

N
Lior Navok
Șerban Nichifor (born 1954)
Luigi Nono 1924–1990)

O

Tera de Marez Oyens

P
Thomas Pasatieri (born 1945)
Krzysztof Penderecki (1933–2020)
Dmitri Pokrass
Yehuda Poliker
Marta Ptaszynska

R
Shulamit Ran
Steve Reich

S
Salem, band
Simon Sargon
Arnold Schoenberg
Erwin Schulhoff
William Schuman

Ronald Senator
Dmitri Shostakovich
Leo Smit
Ben Steinberg
Karlheinz Stockhausen
Karel Švenk (1917–1945)
Władysław Szpilman

T
Carlo Taube
Sir Michael Tippett
Mikis Theodorakis
Marcel Tyberg

U
Viktor Ullmann

W
Ilse Weber
Mieczysław Weinberg
László Weiner (1916–1944)
Lazar Weiner

Z
Herbert Zipper
John Zorn
Krystyna Zywulska

See also
The Holocaust in the arts and popular culture

References

External links
Music of the Holocaust, online exhibition by Yad Vashem

Holocaust
Composers